Terre Haute station, also known as the Big Four Depot, was a train station in Terre Haute, Indiana.

Construction on the Big Four Railroad station started in 1898 and it opened to passengers on July 27, 1899. The station served Big Four (Cleveland, Cincinnati, Chicago and St. Louis Railway) trains, and after the railroad was absorbed into the New York Central, it served trains under that name.

The station was on the New York Central's St. Louis - Indianapolis - Cleveland corridor, and it served several named trains on that route. The trains heading toward Cleveland included Missourian (St. Louis - New York City, with a section to Detroit), Southwestern Limited (St. Louis - New York City), as well as named and unnamed trains running strictly between St. Louis and Cleveland.

The Amtrak National Limited (Kansas City–New York City and Washington, D.C.) ceased operation on October 1, 1979, ending rail service to the city. It was demolished in 1986.

See also
Terre Haute Union Station

References

External links
 Terre Haute Indiana (USA Rail Guide — Train Web)

Buildings and structures in Terre Haute, Indiana
Transportation buildings and structures in Vigo County, Indiana
Former Amtrak stations in Indiana
Former railway stations in Indiana
Former New York Central Railroad stations
Railway stations in the United States opened in 1899
Railway stations closed in 1979
Demolished railway stations in the United States